The film's sets were designed by the art director Willy Reiber. It was shot at the Emelka Studios in Munich.

Cast
 Georg H. Schnell as Thomas Brey
 Olga Gzovskaya as Allan, dessen Nichte
 Helena Makowska as Lucienne d’Or
 Harry Reve as Boxer Harry
 Vladimir Gajdarov
 Toni Wittels

References

Bibliography
 Alfred Krautz. International directory of cinematographers, set- and costume designers in film, Volume 4. Saur, 1984.

External links

1924 films
Films of the Weimar Republic
German silent feature films
Films directed by Georg Asagaroff
German black-and-white films
Bavaria Film films
Films shot at Bavaria Studios
1920s German films